The 2010 ITF Women's Circuit is the 2010 edition of the second tier tour for women's professional tennis. It is organised by the International Tennis Federation and is a tier below the WTA Tour. During the months of January 2010 and March 2010 over 50 tournaments were played with the majority being played in the month of March.

Key

January

February

March

See also 
2010 ITF Women's Circuit
2010 ITF Women's Circuit (April–June)
2010 ITF Women's Circuit (July–September)
2010 ITF Women's Circuit (October–December)
2010 WTA Tour

 01-03